Maurice Camara (born 17 September 1977) is a Guinean former professional footballer. He played in ten matches for the Guinea national team from 1996 to 2000. He was also named in Guinea's squad for the 1998 African Cup of Nations tournament.

References

External links
 
 

1977 births
Living people
Guinean footballers
Guinea international footballers
1998 African Cup of Nations players
Sportspeople from Conakry
Association football defenders
Chambéry SF players
ASFAG players
CA Bastia players
Gazélec Ajaccio players
Guinean expatriate footballers
Expatriate footballers in France